This is a list of Japanese castles utilised by foreign troops.

Lists

References

See also 
Chashi—fortifications built by Ainu people
Gusuku—the castles of the Ryūkyū Kingdom
List of castles
List of castles in Japan
List of foreign-style castles in Japan

Foreign troops